Kheyrabad (also Romanized as Kheyrābād; also known as Khairābād and Khayrabad) is a village in Qarah Bolagh Rural District of Bagh Helli District of Soltaniyeh County, Zanjan province, Iran. At the 2006 National Census, its population was 2,617 in 585 households, when it was in Soltaniyeh District of Abhar County. The following census in 2011 counted 2,405 people in 686 households, by which time the village was in Bagh Helli District of the recently formed Soltaniyeh County; it was the largest village in its rural district.

References 

Soltaniyeh County

Populated places in Zanjan Province

Populated places in Soltaniyeh County